The Rungra People's Pleasure Ground is an amusement park located in Rungra Island, Pyongyang, North Korea. It was opened in 2012 in a ceremony with Kim Jong Un and his wife Ri Sol-ju. It has a dolphinarium, swimming pool, arcade, and a mini golf course. The park has been expanded many times over the years and now has its own trolley transportation system.

See also
List of amusement parks in North Korea

References

External links
 
 
 
 
Rungna People's Pleasure Ground at the Roller Coaster DataBase

2012 establishments in North Korea
Amusement parks in Pyongyang
Amusement parks opened in 2012